The Central Military Hospital Carlos J. Finlay is a Cuban military hospital in Havana, Cuba. It was founded in 1943 with the objective of providing medical attention to the Cuban Military and their families. It is named for Cuban epidemiologist Carlos Finlay.

History 

Originally founded in Camp Columbia military base, the hospital was originally a rustic military hospital.
Under the government of General Mario García Menocal, the order was given to build the hospital for the military and their families. At that time, they began to replace the wood walls, improvised flooring and pavilions with concrete. Some of the pavilions were isolated in an effort to contain infectious diseases.

When Fulgencio Batista took power, he improved the lifestyle and housing conditions of the military. One of the biggest achievements was the inauguration of the hospital in its present location, on September 4, 1943, located on Avenida 31, then named Avenida de Columbia.

References 

Hospital buildings completed in 1943
Hospitals in Cuba
Military units and formations of Cuba
Military hospitals
20th-century architecture in Cuba